Venustus zeteki is a species of beetle in the family Cerambycidae. It was described by Dillon and Dillon in 1945. It is known from Panama, Colombia, Honduras and Ecuador.

References

Onciderini
Beetles described in 1945